Brooks End is a hamlet assimilated with Birchington, in Kent, England, and  southwest of the village's centre. It is in the Thanet local government district and is located on the A28 road to Canterbury. The hamlet is located on the area once under the sea at the Wantsum Channel, and is probably named after one of the numerous brooks covering the area. Nearby is Great Brooksend Farm.

Hamlets in Kent